Acalolepta holotephra is a species of beetle in the family Cerambycidae. It was described by Jean Baptiste Boisduval in 1835. It is known from the Solomon Islands, Australia, and Papua New Guinea. It feeds on Theobroma cacao.

References

Acalolepta
Beetles described in 1835